West Virginia Route 16 (WV 16) is a north–south route located in the U.S. State of West Virginia. The southern terminus of the route is at the Virginia state line in Bishop, McDowell County, where the route continues south as Virginia State Route 16. The northern terminus is at West Virginia Route 2 in St. Marys, Pleasants County, on the south bank of the Ohio River.  WV 16 continues as a same-numbered route into Virginia and North Carolina, ultimately ending in Waxhaw, south of Charlotte and just north of the South Carolina border.  The total length of highway is just under 475 miles (764 km) long.

Major intersections

References

016
West Virginia Route 016
West Virginia Route 016
West Virginia Route 016
West Virginia Route 016
West Virginia Route 016
West Virginia Route 016
West Virginia Route 016
West Virginia Route 016
West Virginia Route 016